is a Japanese columnist and cartoonist. Born in Tokyo to Jun'ichi Natsume, grandson of novelist Natsume Sōseki, he attended Aoyama Gakuin University, where he graduated in 1973.

He was awarded the Tezuka Osamu Cultural Prize (Special Award) in 1999 for the excellence criticism of manga.

He has written the book  (2005), which was illustrated by Fumi Yoshinaga.

References

External links
Official blog
A 2004 interview with Fusanosuke Natsume

Anime and manga critics
Aoyama Gakuin University alumni
Japanese writers
Living people
1950 births
Winner of Tezuka Osamu Cultural Prize (Special Award)